The United Conservative Party (PCU) was a right-wing Chilean political party founded in December 1953 after the merger of the Traditionalist Conservative Party and a faction of the Social Christian Conservative Party, issued from the Conservative Party. It supported for the 1958 presidential election the candidacy of Jorge Alessandri and participated, along with the Liberal Party and supporters of former president Carlos Ibáñez del Campo, in its government. In 1962, it participated in the Democratic Front of Chile center-right coalition which opposed the left-wings FRAP coalition and supported for the 1964 presidential election Eduardo Frei Montalva (who obtained less than 56% of the votes).

Following the low results obtained at the 1965 parliamentary elections, the United Conservative Party merged in 1966 with the Liberal Party and the National Action (founded in 1963 by Jorge Prat Echaurren, who had been Minister of Finances in 1954 in Carlos Ibáñez del Campo's cabinet), thus creating the National Party.

Electoral results
1957 parliamentary election (21 deputies on a total of 147) — 13,8% of the votes 
1961 parliamentary election (17 deputies on a total of 147) — 14,3% of the votes 
1965 parliamentary election (03 deputies on a total of 147) — 05,2% of the votes

Presidential candidates 
The following is a list of the presidential candidates supported by the United Conservative Party. (Information gathered from the Archive of Chilean Elections).
 
1958: Jorge Alessandri (won)
1964: Eduardo Frei Montalva (won)

See also
:Category:United Conservative Party (Chile) politicians
Conservative Party (Chile)
Presidential Republic Era

Footnotes

Further reading
Cruz-Coke, Ricardo. 1984. Historia electoral de Chile. 1925-1973. Editorial Jurídica de Chile. Santiago.
Gil, Federico. 1969. El sistema político de Chile. Editorial Andrés Bello. Santiago.
Pereira, Teresa. 1994. El Partido Conservador: 1930-1965, ideas, figuras y actitudes. Editorial Universitaria. Santiago de Chile.
Sanfuentes Carrión, Marcial. 1957. El Partido Conservador. Editorial Universitaria. Santiago.

Defunct political parties in Chile
Presidential Republic (1925–1973)
Conservative parties in Chile
1953 establishments in Chile
1966 disestablishments in Chile
Political parties established in 1953
Political parties disestablished in 1966